Tjörnarp is a locality situated in Höör Municipality, Skåne County, Sweden, with 731 inhabitants in 2010.

References 

Populated places in Höör Municipality
Populated places in Skåne County